

Dinosaurs

Publications
Richard Owen publishes a monograph on Wealden and Purbeck reptiles, classifying Scelidosaurus, Iguanodon and Echinodon in the new dinosaur clade Prionodontia.

Newly named dinosaurs

Ichthyosaurs

New taxa

Plesiosaurs

New taxa

Pterosaurs

Newly named pterosaurs

Squamates

Newly named mosasaurs

References

1870s in paleontology
Paleontology, 1874 In